Chung Joon-Yang (born : February 3, 1948) is a South Korean businessman, former POSCO chief executive officer, who presently serves as Chairman of National Academy of Engineering of Korea.

Biography
Chung joined POSCO as an associate in 1975. He has contributed to the improvement of the competitiveness of POSCO, leading the development of major technology. He served as chief of Po-hang Iron and Steel Company's branch in Belgium and later served as vice manager of Iron and Steel Making Plant Group at Gwang-yang steelwork in 2003 and was promoted to the chief of Gwang-yang steelwork in 2004. Also, he was the director of the manufacturing technology department and the vice-president of POSCO in 2006. Furthermore, he was appointed as the CEO of POSCO E&C in 2008 and rose to the CEO of POSCO in February, 2009. In addition, he has been the 8th executive director of POSTECH from April, 2011. Moreover, he was appointed as the chief of National Academy of Engineering of Korea.

Education
 1966 Seoul National University High School
 1975 Seoul National University, Technical Education bachelor's degree
 1999 Sunchon National University, Metal Engineering master's degree

Career
1975.03 Joining Pohang Iron & Steel Co.
1975.04~1984.09 Manager of Steel Manufacture Technology at Pohang Iron & Steel Company in Pohang
1984.10~1991.07 Chief of 1st Steel Manufacture at Pohang Iron & Steel Company's in Gwangyang
1991.07~1998.12 Chief of Steel Production Technology at Pohang Iron & Steel Company
1999.01~2002.03 Chief of Pohang Iron & Steel Company in EU Branch
2002.03~2003.03 Director of POSCO in EU Branch
2003.03~2004.03 Vice Director of the Iron & Steel Making Department in Gwangyang
2004.03~2006.02 Director of POSCO in Gwangyang
2006.02~2007.02 Vice President of POSCO in the Manufacturing Technology
2007.02~2008.11 President POSCO in the Manufacturing Technology
2008.11~2014.03 CEO of POSCO
2009.03~ Present Chairman of 7th Korea Iron & Steel Association
2009.10~ Present Member of the executive committee in International Iron and Steel Institute
2011.03~Present, Representative of multi-cultural families forum
2011.06~ Present, President of National Academy of Engineering of Korea

Major activities
2004.03~ Present, International Iron and Steel Institute, technical subcommittee, regular member
2006.03~ Present, The Federation of the Korean Industries, Small And Medium Business Collaboration Center,  director
2007.10~ Present, The Federation of the Korean Industries, Korea-Australia Economic Cooperation, chairman
2008.02~ Present, National Academy of Engineering of Korea, regular member
2008.10~ Present, Korean Institute of Metal and Materials, President

Awards
1992.10 A presidential citation (benefits for construction)
1994.04 Korean Institute of Metal, technological prize
2007.05 Gold Tower Order of Industrial Service Merit
2008 The 8th prize of honored citizen
2009 CEO of this year selected by MAEGYEONG Economy
2011 The 9th most honored enterpriser
2011 Grand prized CEO of Korea in manufacturing industry
2012 The figure of moving Korean economy

Performance
When he was chief of Gwangyang steel mill, he succeed in domestically producing advanced automotive steel sheet which became a major profit center for POSCO.

Advanced automotive steel to produce a stable operating state-of-the-art equipment and technology led to the development of a newly equipped Gwangyang steel and automobile production system based on 6.5 million ton per year to build a great performance.

References

Living people
1948 births
Recipients of the Order of Industrial Service Merit